Daytona Lagoon is a waterpark and family entertainment center located in Daytona Beach, which is owned by a subsidiary of national amusement park operator United Parks.incorrect  Daytona Lagoon is open year-round for its dry attractions, while its waterpark operates from March through September. The park consists of 12 rides incorrect and an 18-hole miniature golf course.

History
Originally built as Adventure Landing, Daytona Lagoon opened in March 2005.

On August 20, 2016, the Volusia County Council approved a lease, enabling a United Parks subsidiary to purchase Daytona Lagoon from DBWP, LLC. The acquisition closed on October 19, 2015. In acquiring Daytona Lagoon, the company pledged to invest more than $2 million over two years to upgrade the waterpark with an overall facelift, new attractions, a broader food selection, and improved amenities.

Rides/Attractions

Water Rides

Blackbeard's Revenge 
Blackbeard's Revenge is a dark-tunnel slide ride in an inflatable 3-person boat. This is a 1 to 3 person ride.

Poseidon's Pass 
Poseidon's Pass is a slide ride much like Blackbeard's Revenge but has three tunnels: The Canyon, The Cave, and The Cavern.  These rides require single or double tubes as a vehicle.

Adventure Mountain 
Speed through 2 sloping slaloms and splash down into a cool pool of water. (Height requirement:42")

Pelican's Drift (Lazy River) 
Much like a lazy river, this river goes around the Castaway Bay.

Castaway Bay 
A large themed play structure with 4 slides for the children. Water shooting nozzles, climbing nets and a bucket that has the Daytona Lagoon logo that dumps 1,000 gallons of water every 2 minutes.

Treasure Lagoon wave pool 
500,000 gallons of water that goes into a wave every couple of minutes.

Kraken's Conquest 

A new ProRacer series speed slide where you can get on a slippery mat and race on one of four lanes of the  tower to the bottom. [Height requirement: ]

Dry Attractions

Grand Prix Go-Kart Raceway 
Daytona Lagoon has one multi-level go-kart track.  The track has a unique design with it starting on the second floor of the facility overlooking the park's two 9-hole miniature golf courses.
Double-seat drivers must have a valid driver's license (non-restricted) to drive a double-seater.

18 Holes of Mini-Golf 
Two 9-hole miniature golf intertwine with Grand Prix Go-Kart Raceway and the waterpark. This park once had three 9-hole miniature golf courses but one was removed in early 2010 to make space for an arcade expansion that included more arcade games and indoor bowling lanes.

Lazer Runner Lazer Tag 
See lazer tag.

Rock Wall 
A  rock wall with timer.

Arcade 
The park has a large arcade that houses over 130 arcade games, prize vending games, ticket redemption games, the Rock Wall and entrance to Laser Tag.

Gallery

External links

References

Water parks in Florida
2005 establishments in Florida